Tam-Tam à Paris is a 30 minute documentary, directed by Thérèse Sita-Bella one of the fist female film makers from Africa.

Plot 
Tam-Tam à Paris documented The National Dance Company of Cameroon, during its tour  in Paris.It was featured in the first FESPACO in 1969.

Production 
The documentary was directed by Thérèse Sita-Bella, in 1969. It has been cited as the first film by a woman from  Sub-Saharan Africa.

References 

Cameroonian documentary films